The  is a professional wrestling tag team title in Japanese promotion Pro Wrestling Noah, contested exclusively among junior heavyweight wrestlers. It was created on July 16, 2003 when Kenta and Naomichi Marufuji defeated Jushin Thunder Liger and Takehiro Murahama in a tournament final. It is currently one of two tag team titles in Noah, along with the typically heavyweight GHC Tag Team Championship.

Title history
Momo no Seishun Tag (Atsushi Kotoge and Daisuke Harada) have the most reigns as a team at 4. Kotoge also has the most reigns as an individual at 9. Inaugural champions Kenta and Naomichi Marufuji have the longest reign as a team, both individual and combined, at 690 days. They also have the most defenses as a team, both in one reign and combined, at 9. Kotaro Suzuki has both the longest combined reign as an individual at 1,515 days, as well as most combined defenses as an individual at 24. The current champions are Yoshinari Ogawa and Eita, who are in their first reign as a team, while it's the ninth individually for Ogawa and the second for Eita.

Reigns

Combined reigns

By team

By wrestler

See also
GHC Heavyweight Championship
GHC National Championship
GHC Tag Team Championship
GHC Junior Heavyweight Championship
GHC Hardcore Tag Team Championship

References

External links
Official title history at noah.co.jp 

Junior heavyweight wrestling championships
Pro Wrestling Noah championships
Tag team wrestling championships